Vadim Shamilievich Gusseinov (born April 27, 1968) is a former professional Kazakhstani ice hockey player. He who played for Torpedo Ust-Kamenogorsk, SKA Khabarovsk, Stroitel Temirtau and Avtomobilist Karagandy. Guseinov is the general manager of KHL team Barys Astana. He was the general manager of Kazzinc-Torpedo from 1991 to 2008.

References

1968 births
Living people
Sportspeople from Oskemen
Amur Khabarovsk players
Avtomobilist Karagandy players
Bulat Temirtau players
Kazakhstani ice hockey forwards
Kazzinc-Torpedo players
Soviet ice hockey forwards